The 1985–86 Los Angeles Kings season, was the Kings' 19th season in the National Hockey League.

Offseason

Regular season

Season standings

Schedule and results

Playoffs
The Kings did not qualify for the postseason for the seventh time in franchise history.

Player statistics

Awards and records

Transactions
The Kings were involved in the following transactions during the 1985–86 season.

Trades

Free agent signings

Free agents lost

Waivers

Draft picks

Farm teams

References
 Kings on Hockey Database

Los Angeles Kings seasons
Los Angeles Kings
Los Angeles Kings
Los Angeles
Los Angeles